Saturday Keigo Erimuya (born 10 January 1998) is a Nigerian professional footballer who plays as a central defender for Spanish club Cádiz CF.

Club career
Between January 2016 and June 2016, Erimuya spent time on loan at Kayseri Erciyesspor in Turkey from Benin-City based BJ Foundation. He was relegated from the 2015–16 TFF First League with the club.

On 26 December 2016, Erimuya signed a four-and-a-half-year contract with Cádiz CF. On 16 September 2019, he extended his contract with the Andalusians until 2023.

On 25 August 2021, Erimuya moved to Real Valladolid on loan for one year, and was assigned to the B-team in Primera División RFEF.

International career
Erimuya was selected by Nigeria for their 18-man Squad for the 2016 Summer Olympics football tournament. He played in one game during the tournament, the bronze medal match against Honduras which Nigeria won 3–2. He was a 92nd minute replacement for Mohammed Usman.

Honours
Nigeria U23
 Olympic Bronze Medal: 2016

References

External links

Nigerian footballers
1998 births
Living people
Footballers at the 2016 Summer Olympics
Olympic footballers of Nigeria
Kayseri Erciyesspor footballers
Primera Federación players
Segunda División B players
Tercera División players
Cádiz CF B players
Cádiz CF players
Real Valladolid Promesas players
Medalists at the 2016 Summer Olympics
Olympic bronze medalists for Nigeria
Olympic medalists in football
Nigerian expatriate footballers
Expatriate footballers in Turkey
Nigerian expatriate sportspeople in Turkey
Association football defenders
TFF First League players
Sportspeople from Benin City